Aurel Braun (born October 18, 1947) is a professor of international relations and political science at the University of Toronto. He is also a senior member of the Center for Eurasian, Russian, and East European Studies and of the Centre for International Studies, and a fellow and senator of Trinity College at the University of Toronto. Braun has been twice appointed as a visiting scholar at the Hoover Institution, Stanford University. Braun received his Ph.D. in international relations from the London School of Economics. He is a Canadian citizen.

Writing
Braun has published extensively on communist affairs and strategic studies with a special focus on the problems of the transformation of the socialist systems in the former Soviet Union and in Eastern Europe. He is also a specialist in international law. He is the author and/or editor of several books. His project on "The Russian Diaspora and the Prospect for Large-Scale Violence" was published by the Council on Foreign Relations in New York.

Selected works 
 NATO-Russia Relations in the 21st Century, Routledge, New York, NY and London, UK, 2008.
 Dilemmas of Transition, Rowman and Littlefield, Lahnam, MD, New York, NY and Oxford, UK, Fall 1999.
 The Extreme Right: Freedom and Security At Risk (with Stephen Scheinberg), Westview Press, Boulder, CO and Oxford, UK, 1997.
 The Soviet-East European Relationship in the Gorbachev Era: The Prospects for Adaptation, Westview Press, Boulder, CO and Oxford, UK, 1990.
 The Middle East in Global Strategy, Westview Press, Boulder CO and Mansell Publishing, London, UK, 1987.
 Small State Security in the Balkans, Macmillan, New York, NY and London, UK, 1983).
 Ceausescu: The Problems of Power, Canadian Institute of International Affairs, Toronto, 1980.
 Romanian Foreign Policy Since 1965: The Political and Military Limits of Autonomy, Praeger, New York, NY, 1978.
 Mandelbaum, Michael, and Aurel Braun. "The dawn of peace in Europe." International Journal 52, no. 2 (1997): 380.

Lecturing
Braun has lectured widely in Canada, the United States, Britain, France, Germany, Belgium, Italy, Switzerland, Russia, Austria and Norway. He is the winner of the PECSU Award for Teaching Excellence at the University of Toronto. He has appeared frequently on national television and radio. He has also participated in the Congressional Program in the United States under the auspices of the Aspen Institute.

Government service
In January 2009, Braun was named chairman of the board of directors of the International Centre for Human Rights and Democratic Development for a three-year term. The organization was dissolved in 2012 after conflict between the Board and the Staff of the agency.

References

External links
Aurel Braun has been quoted in the national and international media. A few examples:
 Lak, Daniel (August 19, 2008). "The bear swaggers again". CBC News.
 Talbott, Strobe (March 12, 1990). "America Abroad the Man Who Made the Ice Melt". Time.
 Manar (August 24, 2007). "Sudan expels top Canadian diplomat". Egypt.com News
 Farnsworth, Clyde H. (October 2, 1993). "Toronto Journal; Russians Are Coming, but for Money". The New York Times
 "Europa, una bomba de tiempo". El Espectador. (October 7, 2008).
 "Whole Show Blow-by-Blow". The Current (September 4, 2007). CBC Radio One.
 Petrou, Michael (July 9, 2008). "Meet the new boss". Maclean's

Living people
Canadian political scientists
Academic staff of the University of Toronto
University of Toronto alumni
International relations scholars
Stanford University staff
1947 births